The belted flycatcher (Xenotriccus callizonus) is a species of bird in the family Tyrannidae. It is found in southern Mexico, Guatemala and El Salvador. It is threatened by habitat loss.

Description
This bird is relatively dull in appearance, though it does sport a flashy crest. The upperparts are a light brown, the underparts a dull yellow. Other features include a pale eye-ring and cocoa wing-bars and chest band, the latter giving it its name. Similar species include the pileated flycatcher and tufted flycatcher.

The bird is usually relatively reclusive, opting to remain concealed in thickets, leaving to hawk or glean insects. It is usually relatively solitary and most likely socially monogamous.

Ecology
Its natural habitat is subtropical or tropical dry scrub forest, especially that dominated by oaks and pines.

References

belted flycatcher
Birds of Mexico
Birds of Guatemala
Birds of El Salvador
belted flycatcher
belted flycatcher
Taxonomy articles created by Polbot